"Rescue You" is a song recorded by Canadian country music group High Valley for their fourth studio album, County Line (2014). It is the last release by the group as a trio before Bryan Rempel departed the band in March 2014, with the rest of the album being recorded as a duo. "Rescue You" was released in Canada on October 15, 2013 through Open Road Recordings as the album's lead single. The song was written by Brad Rempel and Ben Stennis. It was their first top-10 hit on the Canada Country chart.

Chart performance
"Rescue You" entered the Billboard Canadian Hot 100 at number 100 on the chart dated February 1, 2014. It reached a peak position of 80 two weeks later on the chart dated February 15, 2014. The song spent 20 weeks on the Canada Country chart, peaking at number 10 in its twelfth week on the chart dated February 8, 2014.

Music video
The official music video for "Rescue You" was filmed in Watertown, Tennessee and directed by Kristen Barlowe. It premiered December 10, 2013 through Sirius XM's The Highway. Set in a forest, the video depicts a young couple "discovering true love," intercut with scenes of the trio performing.

Track listings

Charts

Release history

References

External links

2013 songs
2013 singles
High Valley songs
Open Road Recordings singles
Songs written by Brad Rempel
Songs written by Ben Stennis